Belgrave Heights Christian School is an, independent, co-educational, Presbyterian school located in Belgrave Heights on the edge of the scenic Dandenong Ranges. It is an open-enrolment school, and is a member of Christian Schools Australia.

Founded in 1983 by Lynette Thompson, Jenny McCallam and Isabel Bell, Belgrave Heights Christian School now caters for over 750 students from Early Years to Year 12.

History
Belgrave Heights Christian School was founded in 1983 as a result of the hard work of Lynette Thompson, Jenny McCallam and Isabel Bell. The school was established at the Belgrave Heights Presbyterian Campsite, and officially began as a Primary School.

In the early 90's, the school's enrolments declined from approximately 45, to a total of four students. This led to a temporary arrangement with Hillcrest Christian College, which allowed the school's numbers to increase again.

In 2002, the school began its journey of transitioning into both a Primary and Secondary School progressively adding secondary year levels over time.

In 2004, Andy Callow was appointed to the position of school principal. He led the school though a period of rapid growth, and continues to serve as principal today.

In 2013, the Kindergarten was opened providing a purpose-built facility for early years education.

See also
 Belgrave
 Belgrave Heights

References

Presbyterian schools in Australia
Private primary schools in Victoria (Australia)
Private secondary schools in Victoria (Australia)
Educational institutions established in 1983
1983 establishments in Australia
Buildings and structures in the Shire of Yarra Ranges